Joseph Wood House is a historic home located at Sayville in Suffolk County, New York.  It was built in 1889 and is a 2-story, wood-framed Shingle Style dwelling of complex massing.  It has a gambrel-roofed main block with -story wings.  It features a continuous porch with attenuated Doric order columns and a porte cochere.

It was added to the National Register of Historic Places in 2003.

References

Houses on the National Register of Historic Places in New York (state)
Houses completed in 1889
Shingle Style houses
Houses in Suffolk County, New York
National Register of Historic Places in Suffolk County, New York
Shingle Style architecture in New York (state)